Children of Sarajevo is a 2012 Bosnian drama film directed by Aida Begić. The film competed in the Un Certain Regard section at the 2012 Cannes Film Festival where it won the Special Distinction award. The film was selected as the Bosnian entry for the Best Foreign Language Oscar at the 85th Academy Awards, but it did not make the final shortlist.

Cast
 Marija Pikić as Rahima
 Ismir Gagula as Nedim
 Bojan Navojec as Davor
 Sanela Pepeljak as Vedrana
 Vedran Đekić as Čiza
 Mario Knezović as Dino
 Jasna Beri as Saliha
 Nikola Đuričko as Tarik
 Staša Dukić as Selma
 Aleksandar Seksan as Rizo
 Velibor Topić as Mirsad Melić

See also
 List of submissions to the 85th Academy Awards for Best Foreign Language Film
 List of Bosnian submissions for the Academy Award for Best Foreign Language Film

References

External links
 
 

2012 films
2012 drama films
Bosnian-language films
Films set in Sarajevo
Bosnia and Herzegovina drama films